This is a list of the largest cities in Baja California. Populations are 2005 National Population Council (CONAPO) estimates. The following list includes information of cities from the Baja California municipalities of Mexicali, Ensenada, Playas de Rosarito, Tijuana and Tecate. Over 75% of the population lives in the largest city; Tijuana, the capital; Mexicali, or the port city of Ensenada

References

External links

Populated places in Baja California